Asghar Ali (born 3 September 1971) is a Pakistani-born cricketer who played for the United Arab Emirates national cricket team. He played two One Day Internationals for them in 1994.

External links

Emirati cricketers
1971 births
Living people
United Arab Emirates One Day International cricketers
People from Kasur District
Pakistani emigrants to the United Arab Emirates
Pakistani expatriate sportspeople in the United Arab Emirates
Wicket-keepers